Sebeš railway station is a railway stop serving the hamlet of Sebeš, in Palilula municipality of Belgrade, Serbia.

Updated in 2016, the station has two side platforms with two tracks. It is served by BG Voz and by Srbija Voz line 52 connecting Pančevo Vojlovica to Pančevački Most.

The station is connected with the Belgrade public transit bus line 108.

References 

Railway stations in Belgrade
Palilula, Belgrade